Taryn Blake Miller (born in 1991 on April 10) who performs as Your Friend, is a musician from Kansas, now based in New York. Miller identifies as GNC/trans-masculine and uses they/them/theirs pronouns.

Miller was born in Winfield, Kansas. They studied music at Cowley Community College for two years before moving to Lawrence to pursue a degree in linguistics at the University of Kansas. Miller produced their first album, Jekyll/Hyde, using $1,000 in prize money from a KJHK-hosted battle of the bands. They signed with Domino Recording Company in February 2014.

Discography

Extended Play

Studio Album

References

External links
Website

1991 births
Living people
Musicians from Kansas
People from Lawrence, Kansas
Cowley County Community College alumni
People from Winfield, Kansas
University of Kansas alumni